"Nada es Imposible" (English: "Nothing is Impossible") is the eighth single from Ricky Martin's album, A Medio Vivir (1995). It was released as a single in the United States on April 22, 1997.

The song was written by Spanish singer-songwriter Alejandro Sanz.

"Nada es Imposible" reached number twenty-three on the Hot Latin Songs in the United States.

Formats and track listings
US CD single
"Nada es Imposible" – 4:22

Charts

References

1997 singles
Ricky Martin songs
Spanish-language songs
Songs written by Alejandro Sanz
1995 songs
Columbia Records singles
Song recordings produced by K. C. Porter